Sir Joshua Vanneck, 1st Baronet (1702 – 6 March 1777) was a British-Dutch merchant.

Venneck was born in The Hague, the son of Cornelius Van Neck. He emigrated to Britain in 1722 and became a successful London merchant. This enabled him to purchase the estate of Heveningham Hall in Suffolk. In 1751 he was created a Baronet, of Putney in the County of Surrey. Vanneck married Mary Anne Daubuz, Huguenot, daughter of Stephen Daubuz, in 1732. He died in March 1777 and was succeeded in the baronetcy by his eldest son Gerard. His second son Joshua jr was raised to the Irish peerage as Baron Huntingfield in 1796.

References
Kidd, Charles, Williamson, David (editors). Debrett's Peerage and Baronetage (1990 edition). New York: St Martin's Press, 1990.

 http://www.pastellists.com/Genealogies/VanNeck.pdf

1702 births
1777 deaths
Baronets in the Baronetage of Great Britain
Businesspeople from The Hague
Dutch emigrants to England
Joshua